Kuruba (also known as "Kuruba Gowda") or Dhangar is a Hindu caste native to the Indian state of Karnataka, Goa, Maharashtra, Uttar Pradesh, Andhra Pradesh, Telangana and Tamilnadu. This is a list of notable Kurubas.

Gods 
 Beerappa is a God of Kuruba community in Telangana, India.
 Revanasiddeswara is a God of Kuruba community in Karnataka, India.

Saints
 Kanaka Dasa (1509 – 1609) was a poet, philosopher, musician and composer from modern Karnataka.
Balumama Maharaj was an Indian guru, religious leader of Dhangar Kuruba community and he is incarnation of lord dattatreya.
 Basavaraja Devaru is an Indian guru, the head of the Dharwad-based Mansur Sri Revana Siddeshwara Mutt.
Beerendra Keshava Tarakananda Puri is the first pontiff of the Kaginele Kanaka Guru Peetha, the cultural and spiritual centre of Kuruba Gowdas of Karnataka, India.
 Sri Niranjananandapuri swamiji Chief guru of Kanaka Guru peeta in Karnataka.
 Sri Siddaramananda mahaswamiji. Head of Halumatha Kendra, kanaka gurupeeta. Tinthani bridge,Deodurga TQ. Raichur dt,

Warriors
 Harihara I (1336-1356), Founder of the Vijayanagara empire.
 Bukka Raya I (1356-1377), Emperor of the Vijayanagara Empire from the Sangama Dynasty.
 Wadiyar Dynasty of kingdom of Mysore.
 Ahilyabai Holkar (31 May 1725 – 13 August 1795) was the Holkar Queen of the Maratha Indore state, India.
 Ramachandra of Devagiri (1271-1311), King of the Seuna (Yadava) dynasty.
 Mahendravarman I (600–630), King of the Pallava dynasty.
 Dantidurga (735-756), King of the Rashtrakuta Empire of Manyakheta. This dynasty is different from earlier several Rashtrakuta dynasties that ruled small kingdoms in northern and central India and the Deccan between the 6th and 7th centuries.
 Dridhaprahara (860-880), Founder of the Seuna (dhangar) dynasty that ruled Maharashtra. It is the foundational dynasty of modern day Maharashtra and first major Kingdom to use Marathi as a state language.
 Vira Someshwara (1234–1263), King of the Hoysala Empire.
 Malhar Rao Holkar (1694-1766), Founder of the Maratha Indore state.
 Yashwant Rao Holkar (1797-1811), King of the Maratha Indore state.
Sangolli Rayanna, 18th century freedom fighter and a warrior who fought the British East India Company in South India.
 Junje Gowda, Builder of the Sri Male Mahadeshwara Swamy temple at MM hills.
 Kaka Nayaka, A legendary leader after whom the Kakanakote forest is named.

Politics 
 Siddaramaiah, former Chief Minister of Karnataka and current Leader of the Opposition in the Karnataka Legislative Assembly.
 K. S. Eshwarappa, current minister in the Government of Karnataka, former Deputy Chief Minister of Karnataka and former Leader of the Opposition in the Karnataka Legislative Council.
 Bandaru Dattatreya, Governor of the State of Himachal Pradesh. He was the Member of Parliament Lok Sabha from Secunderabad between 1991-2004 and 2014-2019. He was a former minister in the Government of India under multiple administrations.
 Mahadev Jankar, Founder President Rashtriya samaj party, A strong political party for the upliftment of Samaj former cabinet minister and current member of Maharashtra Legislative Assembly. 
 Vikas Mahatme, Member of parliament in Rajya Sabha for Maharashtra. He has been awarded Padma Shri for his contribution to ophthalmology and social work.
 Kollur Mallappa was the first President of Hyderabad Pradesh Congress Committee, prior to the merger of Hyderabad state into Andhra Pradesh. He was Member of Parliament from Raichur, now in Karnataka for several terms. He was mentor of late Indian Prime Minister P. V. Narasimha Rao.
 Chandrakant Kavlekar, current Deputy Chief Minister of Goa.
 Ganpatrao Deshmukh, former cabinet minister and current MLA from Sangola, holds record for longest serving MLA (1962 to present).
 D. K. Naikar, Former Karnataka PCC President (1995-1996), he was a Member of Parliament from Dharwad North constituency in Karnataka State, India . He was elected to 7th,8th,9th & 10th Lok Sabha.
Channaiah Odeyar former Member of Parliament, Davanagere district.
 C. S. Shivalli, former minister in the Government of Karnataka.
 M. D. Nataraj was former member of Karnataka Legislative Council and the son-in-law of late Devaraj Urs.
 Gopichand Padalkar, current member of Maharashtra Legislative Council from Maharashtra.
 Ram Shinde, former minister in Maharashtra government.
 Dattatray Vithoba Bharne, current state minister in Maharashtra government.
 Anna Dange, former minister in Maharashtra government.
 S. P. Singh Baghel, Member of parliament, Lok Sabha and Central Minister Law and justice  in second Modi cabinet ministers from Uttar Pradesh.
 V. L. Patil widely known as 'Aabaji' was a former minister in the Government of Karnataka. He was a well known industrialist and a freedom fighter.
 Adagur H. Vishwanath, former minister in the Government of Karnataka, former Member of Parliament from Karnataka and current member of Karnataka Legislative Council.
  H M Revanna, former minister in the Government of Karnataka and current member of Karnataka Legislative Council.
 Bandeppa Kashempur, former minister in the Government of Karnataka.
 Malagundla SankaraNarayana, current Minister for Roads & Buildings from Andhra Pradesh.
 Kuruva Gorantla Madhav, current Member of Parliament from Andhra Pradesh.
 Dinesh Mohaniya, current member Delhi Legislative Assembly.
 Talasani srinivas yadav, minister in Telangana 
 Anil Anna Gote, current member of Maharashtra Legislative Assembly.
 B K Parthasarathi, former Member of Parliament from Andhra Pradesh.
 Ajit Singh Pal, current minister in the Government of Uttar Pradesh.

Others
 Sagarika Ghatge  is an Indian model and national level athlete. She is related to a former royal house of India through Shahu Maharaj of Kolhapur, with her father being from the former royal family of Kagal and her grandmother, Sita Raje Ghatge, being the daughter of Tukojirao Holkar III of Indore. She is the wife of former India national cricket team member Zaheer Khan.
 Kancha Ilaiah is an Indian political theorist, writer and activist.
 Belli Lalitha was Indian folk singer and founder of Telangana Kala Samithi.
 Bapu Biru Vategaonkar was an Indian social worker and youth idol. He was also known as Robin hood and Borgaoncha Vagh(Tiger).
 Vanita kharat is a Marathi actress.
 Padmashri Rukhminitai Baburao Pawar Former president Shri.Mahila Grih Udyog Lijjat Papad. She has been awarded Padma Shri for his contribution to Womens Association and social work.

References

Kuruba
Dhangar